The women's scratch competition at the 2022 UEC European Track Championships was held on 12 August 2022.

Results
First rider across the line without a net lap loss wins.

References

Women's scratch
European Track Championships – Women's scratch